Jordan Genmark Heath (born December 16, 1997) is a Swedish professional gridiron football linebacker for the Philadelphia Stars of the United States Football League (USFL). He played college football for Notre Dame and UCLA.

College career
Genmark Heath began his college career at Notre Dame in 2017 as a safety. In April 2018, he switched from safety to linebacker.

In September 2020, Genmark Heath left the Notre Dame football team.

In October 2020, he committed to UCLA.

Professional career
In May 2022, Genmark Heath attended rookie mini-camp with the Kansas City Chiefs as a tryout player.

Genmark Heath was drafted by the Saskatchewan Roughriders in the 2022 CFL Global Draft. He signed with Saskatchewan in October 2022. He signed with the team on October 4, 2022, but was released on October 31.

Genmark Heath signed with the Philadelphia Stars of the USFL on January 11, 2023.

Personal life
Genmark Heath moved from Sweden to the United States at age 14. He grew up a fan of the San Diego Chargers.

References

External links
 Notre Dame Fighting Irish football bio
 UCLA Bruins football bio

1997 births
Living people
Swedish players of American football
Swedish players of Canadian football
American football linebackers
Canadian football linebackers
Notre Dame Fighting Irish football players
UCLA Bruins football players
Saskatchewan Roughriders players
Sportspeople from Stockholm
Philadelphia Stars (2022) players